Desmond Randolph Chumney (born 8 January 1968) is a Canadian cricketer. He is a right-handed batsman and a right-arm offbreak bowler. He played 13 One Day Internationals for Canada, including the 2003 World Cup.

When Canada beat Bangladesh in that World Cup, Chumney ran around the field with a Canada flag. He also played in three ICC Intercontinental Cup matches, three ICC Trophy tournaments and the 2004 ICC Americas Championship. He was selected for the 2007 Cricket World Cup and made 27* in his last appearance for Canada.

References

1968 births
Living people
Canadian cricketers
Canada One Day International cricketers
Saint Kitts and Nevis emigrants to Canada
Kittitian cricketers